Saurabh Bagchi is an Indian-born American academic researcher and educator in the area of computer science and engineering. He is a professor of Electrical and Computer Engineering and Computer Science at Purdue University. His contributions have been in the area of reliability and security of distributed computing systems and Internet-of-Things (IoT).

Education 
He earned his B.Tech. degree in Computer Science and Engineering from the Indian Institute of Technology in Kharagpur, India. He earned his MS and Ph.D. degrees in Computer Science from the University of Illinois at Urbana-Champaign in 1999 and 2001 respectively, working with Prof. Ravishankar Iyer.

Career 
From 2001 to 2002, he was a Research Staff Member at the IBM Thomas J. Watson Research Center in New York, NY in the Distributed Messaging Systems group. He joined Purdue University in 2002 at the West Lafayette campus in Indiana, where he was subsequently promoted to Associate Professor and then Full Professor. He founded and directs a university-wide center called CRISP (Center for Resilient Infrastructures, Systems, and Processes) with about 25 affiliated faculty.

He has supervised 24 Ph.D. dissertations and about 50 MS dissertations. He is the co-author of a book from Springer titled "System Dependability and Analytics - Approaching System Dependability from Data, System and Analytics Perspectives" and a book on wireless security. 

He has published more than 850 articles in books, journals, and conferences that have been cited more than 9,300 times for an h-index value of (52, 33) (All, Recent).

Professional affiliations 
Saurabh is a faculty member at Purdue University in ECE and CS. He is also the Inaugural International Visiting Faculty at IIT Kharagpur in the Computer Science and Engineering department. He was the co-founder of a startup called SensorHound Innovations LLC in 2013, which worked in the area of IoT reliability. He is the CTO of a recent startup called KeyByte LLC (from 2021) which is seeking to commercialize the research innovations from his lab in cloud-hosted databases.

References 

Living people
Year of birth missing (living people)
Computer engineers
American electrical engineers
Purdue University faculty
Indian emigrants to the United States
Scholars from Kolkata